Waite Fountain is an outdoor fountain installed on the Oregon State Capitol grounds, in Salem, Oregon, United States. The original cylindrical fountain was erected in 1912. It was damaged during the Columbus Day Storm of 1962, and has been replaced by a low, modern pool fountain.

See also

 1912 in art

References

External links
 

1912 establishments in Oregon
1912 sculptures
Fountains in Salem, Oregon
Outdoor sculptures in Salem, Oregon